Engram may refer to:

Engram (neuropsychology), a physical means by which memory traces are stored
Engram (Dianetics), a term used in Scientology and Dianetics for a "recording" of a past painful event not normally accessible to the conscious mind
Engram (album), a 2009 album by black metal band Beherit
Engram (film), a 2014 short film

People with the surname Engram

Bobby Engram, American football player
Bryan Engram, Canadian football player
Evan Engram, American football player

See also
 N-gram
 Ingram (disambiguation)
 Enneagram (disambiguation)